Graphene foam is a solid, open-cell foam made of single-layer sheets of graphene. It is a candidate substrate for the electrode of lithium-ion batteries.

Synthesis 
The foam can be manufactured using vapor deposition to coat a metal foam, a three-dimensional mesh of metal filaments. The metal is then removed.

Applications

Electrode 
A physically flexible battery was created using the foam for electrodes. Both electrodes were lightweight and their large surface area provided high energy density of 110 Wh/kg, comparable to commercial batteries.

Power density was much greater than a typical battery. At a rate that completely discharged the material in 18 seconds, power delivered was 80 percent of what it produced during an hour-long discharge. Performance remained stable through 500 charge/discharge cycles.

Support 
In 2017 researchers used carbon nanotubes to reinforce a foam. The latter material supports 3,000 times its own weight and can return to its original shape when unweighted. Nanotubes, a powdered nickel catalyst and sugar were mixed. Dried pellets of the substance were then compressed in a steel die in the shape of a screw. The nickel was removed, leaving a screw-shaped piece of foam. The nanotubes' outer layers split and bonded with the graphene.

See also 

 Aerographene
 Lithium-ion battery
 Foam

References

Further reading
 

Lithium-ion batteries
Graphene
Electrodes